The 1894 British Columbia general election was held in 1894.  The number of members remained at 33 with the number of ridings increased to 26 as a result of the partition of the Yale and Westminster ridings.

Unlike the previous BC general election, in 1894 of the 33 MLAs 20 were elected in single member districts. There were also three 2-member districts, one 3-member district and one 4-member district. Each voter could cast as many votes as there were seats to fill in the district.

Political context

Issues and debates

Non-party system

There were to be no political parties in the new province.  The designations "Government" and "Opposition" and "Independent" (and variations on these) functioned in place of parties, but they were very loose and do not represent formal coalitions, more alignments of support during the campaign.  "Government" meant in support of the current Premier; "Opposition" meant campaigning against him, and often enough the Opposition would win and immediately become the Government.

Although Labour as a party had run candidates in previous election, this election saw the first victories by Labour candidates (in Nanaimo and Nanaimo City), and a "Farmer" candidate (in the second Nanaimo seat).  As well a Labour-oriented Nationalist Party candidate was elected in Vancouver City - Robert Macpherson.

There were five successful independents.

The Robson Government

The government of newspaperman John Robson received a mandate after assuming power the year before.  Robson died in office in 1892, yielding to Theodore Davie.

Byelections not shown

Any changes due to byelections are shown below the main table showing the theoretical composition of the House after the election.  A final table showing the composition of the House at the dissolution of the Legislature at the end of this Parliament can be found below the byelections.  The main table represents the immediate results of the election only, not changes in governing coalitions or eventual changes due to byelections.

List of ridings

The original ridings were thirteen in number, and Cowichan was restored to a two-member seat while Westminster (formerly New Westminster, actually the rural areas of the New Westminster Land District rather than the City of New Westminster, which was and continued to be represented by New Westminster City) was partitioned in four; Vancouver City was increased to three members from two while Cariboo was decreased to two from three.  The Victoria, Nanaimo, West Kootenay and Lillooet ridings were partitioned also, and the Alberni and Cowichan ridings were combined into Cowichan-Alberni, which was a two-member seat.  In addition the Nanaimo-area riding of The Islands which had appeared for the first time in 1890 election was no longer on the hustings, although it would re-appear again following the major redistribution that preceded the 1903 election. There were no political parties were not acceptable in the House by convention, though some members were openly partisan at the federal level (usually Conservative, although both Liberal and Labour allegiance were on display by some candidates).

These ridings were:

Cariboo (three members)
Cassiar (one member)
Comox  (one member)
Cowichan-Alberni (two members)
East Kootenay
Esquimalt (two members)
Lillooet East  (one member)
Lillooet West  (one member)
North Nanaimo  (one member)
South Nanaimo  (one member)
Nanaimo City  (one member)
New Westminster City  (one member)
North Victoria  (one member)
South Victoria  (one member)
Vancouver City (three members)
Victoria City (four members)
West Kootenay (north riding)  (one member)
West Kootenay (south riding)  (one member)
Westminster-Chilliwhack  (one member)
Westminster-Delta  (one member)
Westminster-Dewdney  (one member)
Westminster-Richmond (one member)
Yale-East  (one member)
Yale-North (one member)
Yale-West  (one member)

Polling conditions

Natives (First Nations) and Chinese were disallowed from voting, although naturalized Kanakas (Hawaiian colonists) and American and West Indian blacks and certain others participated.  The requirement that knowledge of English be spoken for balloting was discussed but not applied.

Results by riding

|-
||    
|align="center"|William Adams
|align="center" rowspan=2 |CaribooGovernment
||    
||    
|align="center"  |Lillooet EastOpposition
|align="center"|James Douglas Prentice
||    
|-
||    
|align="center"|Samuel Augustus Rogers
||    
||    
|align="center"  |New Westminster CityOpposition
|align="center"|James Buckham Kennedy
||    
|-
||    
|align="center"|John Irving
|align="center"  |CassiarGovernment
||    
||    
|align="center" rowspan=3 |Vancouver CityOpposition
|align="center"|Francis Lovett Carter-Cotton
||    
|-
||    
|align="center"|Joseph Hunter
|align="center"  |ComoxGovernment
||    
||    
|align="center"|Robert Macpherson
||    
|-
||    
|align="center"|Theodore Davie1
|align="center" rowspan=2 |Cowichan-AlberniGovernment
||    
||    
|align="center"|Adolphus Williams
||    
|-
||    
|align="center"|James Mitchell Mutter
||    
||    
|align="center"  |West Kootenay (South riding)Opposition
|align="center"|John Frederick Hume
||    
|-
||    
|align="center"|James Baker
|align="center" |East KootenayGovernment
||    
||    
|align="center"  |Westminster-DewdneyOpposition
|align="center"|Colin Buchanan Sword
||    
|-
||    
|align="center"|Theodore Davie
|align="center" rowspan=2 |EsquimaltGovernment
||    
||    
|align="center"  |Yale-EastOpposition
|align="center"|Donald Graham
||    
|-
||    
|align="center"|Charles Edward Pooley
||    
||    
|align="center"  |Westminster-DeltaOpposition
|align="center"|Thomas William Forster
||    
|-
||    
|align="center"|Alfred Wellington Smith
|align="center"  |Lillooet WestGovernment
||    
||    
|align="center"  |Yale-WestOpposition
|align="center"|Charles Augustus Semlin
||    
|-
||    
|align="center"|James McGregor
|align="center"  |Nanaimo CityGovernment
||    
|-
||    
|align="center"|John Bryden
|align="center"  |North NanaimoGovernment
||    
|-
||    
|align="center"|John Paton Booth
|align="center"  |North VictoriaGovernment
||    
|-
||    
|align="center"|William Wymond Walkem
|align="center"  |South NanaimoGovernment
||    
|-
||    
|align="center"|David McEwen Eberts
|align="center"  |South VictoriaGovernment
||    
|-
||    
|align="center"|John Braden
|align="center" rowspan=4 |Victoria CityGovernment
||    
|-
||    
|align="center"|Henry Dallas Helmcken
||    
|-
||    
|align="center"|Robert Paterson Rithet
||    
|-
||    
|align="center"|John Herbert Turner
||    
|-
||    
|align="center"|James M. Kellie
|align="center"  |West Kootenay (North riding)Government
||    
|-
||    
|align="center"|Thomas Edwin Kitchen
|align="center"  |Westminster-ChilliwhackGovernment
||    
|-
||    
|align="center"|Thomas Kidd
|align="center"  |Westminster-RichmondGovernment
||    
|-
||    
|align="center"|George Bohun Martin
|align="center"  |Yale-NorthGovernment
||    
|-
|
|align-left"|1 Premier-Elect and Incumbent Premier
|-
| align="center" colspan="10"|Source: Elections BC
|-
|}

See also

List of British Columbia political parties

Further reading & references

In the Sea of Sterile Mountains: The Chinese in British Columbia, Joseph Morton, J.J. Douglas, Vancouver (1974).  Despite its title, a fairly thorough account of the politicians and electoral politics in early BC.

Specific

1894
1894 elections in Canada
1894 in British Columbia